The King of Crunk & BME Recordings Present: Trillville & Lil Scrappy is a split album between BME artists Trillville and Lil Scrappy released by Black Market Entertainment, Reprise Records and Warner Bros. Records on February 24, 2004. The album is certified Gold in the United States by the RIAA. On copies with Trillville on the front cover, the Trillville side appears 1st and on copies with Lil Scrappy on the cover the Lil Scrappy side appears 1st.

The 1st single is "Neva Eva" By Trillville. It was recorded in 2003 and released in November of that year. It was released on CD and also has a music video. The 2nd single is "Some Cut" By Trillville. It was released in 2004 and it has a music video. The 3rd and final single is "No Problem" by Lil Scrappy. It was released in 2004 and has a music video.

Track listing

Notes
Joe Bingo – Co-Produced (track 3), Producer (track 9) Lil Scrappy Side

Charts

Weekly charts

Year-end charts

References

2004 debut albums
Albums produced by Lil Jon
Lil Scrappy albums
Split albums